The IQA World Cup is an international quidditch tournament contested by the national teams of the members of the International Quidditch Association, the sport's global governing organisation. The championship, which was named Summer Games and Global Games in its first two editions, has been awarded every two years since 2012. The current champions are the United States, who defeated Belgium in 2018.

History

The World Cup was first held in July 2012. The tournament was named the "Summer Games" in accordance with its unofficial tie-in to the 2012 Summer Olympics, and because the name "World Cup" was already being used since 2007 for a club championship held in the United States. The tournament was held in Oxford, United Kingdom as the Olympic torch was passing through the city. Five teams participated: Australia, Canada, France, the United Kingdom, and the United States. The event followed a round-robin format, with the lowest ranked team being eliminated and the others advancing to the bracket phase. The UK was defeated by all other competitors and did not make the bracket. The US took first place, defeating France in the final, and Australia claimed bronze by defeating Canada.

In 2014, the tournament was renamed "Global Games" and took place under an updated IQA which became an international sports federation. The Games were under the supervision of US Quidditch but were held in Burnaby, British Columbia, Canada. Seven teams came out to compete: Australia, Belgium, Canada, France, Mexico, the United Kingdom, and the United States. Italy had planned to compete but had to pull out. The event was contested over a round-robin, with positions in a series of playoffs determined by each team's result in the first round. Due to limited media relations and improper planning, the tournament was relatively unknown and had a lacking medical staff which became evident when Belgium chose to forfeit after suffering multiple injuries. The United States defended their title by defeating Australia in the final, and Canada claimed bronze by defeating the United Kingdom.

The 2016 World Cup took place in Frankfurt, Germany. The initial tournament plan involved 24 competing teams, but because of the dropouts of five teams, the number of expected nations was reduced to 19. Later, Brazil and Slovakia were added to the roster of teams, resulting in a field of 21 nations. The tournament took place using a pool-play format, followed by a single-elimination bracket with all 21 teams. Ahead of the tournament, exhibition matches were held between Canada and the United Kingdom, Turkey and Mexico and Australia and Germany.  After a pool-play and bracket tournament, Australia defeated the United States 150*–130 in the final. The United States had first made a snitch catch which was disallowed on the grounds of charging the snitch. When the Australian seeker caught the snitch, the catch was initially challenged due to the seeker having been hit by a bludger. However the beat was ruled out as the beater had himself been hit by a bludger. The catch was therefore called good and Australia won the match and the United States suffered their first defeat. In the third place match, the United Kingdom avenged their defeat in the 2014 third place playoff years prior by beating Canada 190*–60. Both the final and bronze playoff were therefore re-runs of the same games from the previous World Cup, both with the reverse result.

The 2018 World Cup was held in Florence, Italy with 29 teams competing. There has been much online controversy about the unexpected hike in tournament fees, which has forced some smaller nations to drop out, namely Denmark and Sweden, both of whom would have been attending for the first time.

Format

Qualification
None of the competitions so far have involved a qualification round. To be eligible, the team must be representing a region's national governing body.

Results
The following table shows a list of all World Cups to date. The team that caught the snitch is denoted with an asterisk.

Medals summary

Appearance

Legend
 – Champions
 – Runners-up
 – Third place
 – Fourth place
 – Did not enter / Did not qualify
 – Hosts
Q – Qualified for forthcoming tournament
 – Withdrew from the tournament

See also

 International Quidditch Association
 Quidditch (sport)
 European Games (quidditch)

References

Notes

External links

 
Recurring sporting events established in 2012
Quidditch competitions
World championships
World cups